The Nu Kats - Plastic Facts recorded at Studio Orange, mixed at The Music Grinder Hollywood in 1980. Produced by Larry Lee

Track listing

Side One
"World All Alone" (Pete McRae, F. Moore)
"Busy Body" (F. Moore)

Side Two
"It's Not A Rumour" (Freddy Moore, Demi Moore)
"Out Of The Combat Zone" (F. Moore)
"I Was A Teenage Shoplifter" (F. Moore)

Personnel
Al Galles - drums, harmony, cowbell, claps
Bobbyzio Moore - sax, keyboards, guitar, maracas, tambourine, claps
Freddy Moore - lead vocals, 6 & 12 string, harmony, tambourine, claps 
Dennis Peters - bass, harmony, fuzz guitar, snaps, claps
Larry Lee - producer, piano, harmony, claps, snaps
Tony Cassella - engineer at Studio Orange
Gary Skardina - mix engineer at Music Grinder
Bobbyzio Moore - choir
Monica Lustgarten - choir
Maggie Lee - choir
Demi Moore - choir
Scott Brandt - road manager
Jerry Garns - cover photo
Sandii Procter - make up 
Loni Specter - liner photo
Harold Bronson - liner notes

References

1980 EPs
The Nu Kats albums